Marius Bunescu (15 May 1881 – 31 March 1971) was a Romanian painter, organizer of the National Museum of Art, and director of the Anastase Simu Museum.

Bunescu was born in Caracal, Romanați County, the son of Ioniță Bunea, a craftsman. His first artistic training was with Dimitrie Hârlescu in Constanța from 1904 to 1906, after which he went to study at the Academy of Fine Arts in Munich, where he worked with Hermann Groeber. He made his debut in 1911 at the Official Salon in Bucharest, and he had his first personal exhibit in 1919, at the Minerva Library. In 1924 he exhibited some of his paintings at the Romanian pavilion, during the Venice Biennale arts festival; he returned for exhibits at the Biennale in 1942 and 1954.

He began his long administrative career in 1920, becoming director of the Anastase Simu Museum, and later, after the death of the art collector in 1935, of the Simu Memorial House. In 1941 he was awarded the Order of the Crown, Commander rank. In 1944 he wrote a biographical study of Anastase Simu. Two years later, Bunescu was the chief force behind the initiative to open an art gallery at the high school in Caracal; the gallery now bears his name. In 1949 he took over the management of the Picture Gallery at the National Museum of Art.

He was married to Magda, and had two sons, Preda (who defected to Germany, and worked at Radio Free Europe), and Udrea (a doctor who later left for Belgium).

Bunescu died in Bucharest in 1971 and is buried in the Romanian Orthodox Bellu Cemetery.

He and his paintings appear on several stamps issued by Poșta Română: Venice paintings (1.55 and 6.40 lei, 1972), Construction Area painting (20 bani, 1973), Portrait (2.15 lei, 1981), Danube at the Cazan painting (2.80 lei, 2019).

References

External links

1881 births
1971 deaths
People from Caracal, Romania
Academy of Fine Arts, Munich alumni
20th-century Romanian painters
Recipients of the Order of Cultural Merit (Romania)
Commanders of the Order of the Crown (Romania)
Burials at Bellu Cemetery